The dark moray eel (Gymnothorax afer) is a moray eel found in the eastern Atlantic Ocean, from Mauritania to Cape Frio, Namibia. It was first named by Marcus Elieser Bloch in 1795,.

References

dark moray eel
Fish of the East Atlantic
Marine fauna of West Africa
dark moray eel
Taxa named by Marcus Elieser Bloch